County Hall is a municipal facility in Kilkenny, County Kilkenny, Ireland.

History

The original building on the site was commissioned by James Butler, 1st Duke of Ormond as the new home for Kilkenny Grammar School and was completed in 1667. The current building, which was designed by Charles Vierpyl in the Neoclassical style to replace the original facility, was completed in 1785. A serious fire engulfed the building and left the roof badly damaged in 1980; pupils and teachers had to move out while major repairs were carried out. It remained the home of what became Kilkenny College until the school moved to modern facilities at McAdoo Hall on the Celbridge House site in 1985. Kilkenny County Council, which had previously been accommodated in offices at John's Green House, moved into the building in 1994.

References

Buildings and structures in County Kilkenny
Kilkenny